Mayariochloa is a genus of Cuban plants in the grass family. The only known species is Mayariochloa amphistemon, native to central and eastern Cuba.

The leaves are mostly basal.

References

Panicoideae
Monotypic Poaceae genera
Endemic flora of Cuba
Grasses of North America